Asoka Weerasinghe (born in Sri Lanka), was a former deputy High Commissioner for Sri Lanka in Canada.

Early life
Asoka was educated at Nalanda College Colombo, Sri Lanka.

Poetry
His poem "Trail of Mankind" was adopted as the storyline for Canada's National Museum of Man's Orientation Hall in Ottawa 1972. Books written by him were shortlisted for the Archibald Lampman and Lampman-Scott Award as well.

By profession he is a Geologist, Paleontology and Museology and also one time Curator of the Ottawa Museum in Canada.

References 

 

 

 

 

 Submission project peace for a united Sri Lanka
 Asoka Weerasinghe Interviewed by Rajendra Alwis

Alumni of Nalanda College, Colombo
Canadian people of Sri Lankan descent
Sinhalese civil servants
Sri Lankan diplomats
Sinhalese poets
Sri Lankan Buddhists